North Dakota Highway 60 (ND 60) is a  east–west state highway in the U.S. state of North Dakota. ND 60's southern terminus is at ND 3 and the western terminus of ND 17 north of Rugby, and the northern terminus is at ND 5 east of Bottineau.

Major intersections

References

060
Transportation in Bottineau County, North Dakota
Transportation in Pierce County, North Dakota